William Tremblay (August 10, 1877 – November 15, 1973) was a politician in Quebec, Canada and a Member of the Legislative Assembly of Quebec (MLA).

Early life

He was born on August 10, 1877 in Chicoutimi.

First Attempt in Federal Politics

Tremblay ran as a Labour candidate in the district of Maisonneuve in the 1925 federal election and finished a distant third against Liberal incumbent Clément Robitaille.

Member of the legislature

He ran as a Labor candidate in the district of Maisonneuve in the 1927 provincial election and won. He finished a distant third in the 1931 election and was defeated by Liberal candidate Charles-Joseph Arcand.

Tremblay was re-elected as a Conservative candidate in the 1935 election. He joined Maurice Duplessis's Union Nationale and was re-elected in the 1936 election.

Cabinet Member

He served as Minister of Labour from 1936 until the 1939 election, when he was defeated by Liberal incumbent Joseph-Georges Caron.

Last Attempt in Federal Politics

Tremblay ran as a Progressive Conservative candidate in the district of Maisonneuve—Rosemont in the 1945 federal election. He finished third against Liberal candidate Sarto Fournier.

Death

He died on November 15, 1973.

References

1877 births
1973 deaths
Labour Party (Quebec) MNAs
Conservative Party of Quebec MNAs
Union Nationale (Quebec) MNAs
Politicians from Saguenay, Quebec
Progressive Conservative Party of Canada candidates for the Canadian House of Commons
Candidates in the 1945 Canadian federal election